Norman Donald Paul Duncan (16 December 1922 – 22 June 1990) was an Australian rules footballer who played with South Melbourne in the Victorian Football League (VFL).

He also served in the Royal Australian Air Force during World War II.

Notes

External links 

1922 births
1990 deaths
Australian rules footballers from Melbourne
Sydney Swans players
Royal Australian Air Force personnel of World War II
People from Carlton, Victoria
Military personnel from Melbourne